The Talbot Memorial Bridge  is a road bridge spanning the River Liffey in Dublin, Ireland. Completed in 1978, it is 22 metres (72 feet) wide, and was designed by De Leuw, Chadwick and O’hEocha Consulting Engineers. The bridge marks the furthest point up to the Liffey to which tall ships may travel, as all bridges downriver of it are either swingbridges or bascule.

The bridge links Memorial Road (and Custom House Quay) on the north bank of the river to Moss Street (and City Quay) on the south bank. Memorial Road was named in commemoration of those members of the Dublin Brigade who died during the Irish War of Independence - notably those who died in a raid on the nearby Custom House. The "Talbot" reference in the bridge's name is in remembrance of Matt Talbot. Talbot was a temperance campaigner from Dublin's Northside, a statue of whom stands at the south end of the bridge.

References

External links
 New Bridge Over The Liffey — 11 December 1976 news report from RTÉ archives

Bridges in Dublin (city)
Bridges completed in 1978
Monuments and memorials in Ireland